Alfons Mayer (1 February 1938 – 2 November 2021) was a Canadian sports shooter. He competed at the 1968 Summer Olympics and the 1972 Summer Olympics.

Mayer died in Kitchener, Ontario on 2 November 2021, at the age of 83.

References

External links
 

1938 births
2021 deaths
Canadian male sport shooters
Olympic shooters of Canada
Shooters at the 1968 Summer Olympics
Shooters at the 1972 Summer Olympics
People from Lindau (district)
Sportspeople from Swabia (Bavaria)
German emigrants to Canada
Pan American Games medalists in shooting
Pan American Games gold medalists for Canada
Pan American Games silver medalists for Canada
Pan American Games bronze medalists for Canada
Shooters at the 1967 Pan American Games
20th-century Canadian people